The Chalybeate Springs Hotel Springhouse, near Smiths Grove, Kentucky, was listed on the National Register of Historic Places in 2018.

See also
Bransford Spring Pumphouse, also NRHP-listed in Edmonson County
National Register of Historic Places listings in Edmonson County, Kentucky

References

National Register of Historic Places in Edmonson County, Kentucky
Spring houses
Water supply infrastructure on the National Register of Historic Places
Water supply infrastructure in Kentucky
Springs of Kentucky